Angaria melanacantha, common name the black-tankard angaria, is a species of sea snail, a marine gastropod mollusk in the family Angariidae.

Description

The shell can grow to be 35 mm to 95 mm in length.

Distribution
Angaria melanacantha can be found off of the Philippines and Vietnam.

References

 MacDonald & Co (1979). The MacDonald Encyclopedia of Shells. MacDonald & Co. London & Sydney.

External References
 Poppe G.T. & Goto Y. (1993) Recent Angariidae. Ancona: Informatore Piceno. 32 pls, 10 pls.

Angariidae
Gastropods described in 1842